Acianthera subrotundifolia is a species of orchid plant native to Brazil.

References 

subrotundifolia
Flora of Brazil
Taxa named by Alfred Cogniaux